Synchronic is a 2019 American science fiction horror film written by Justin Benson, who also directed and produced with Aaron Moorhead. It shares continuity with other films by Benson and Moorhead, following Resolution and The Endless. Synchronic stars Anthony Mackie and Jamie Dornan as paramedics who investigate a series of inexplicable deaths and their connection to a new designer drug.

It had its world premiere at the 2019 Toronto International Film Festival. It was released on October 23, 2020, by Well GO USA Entertainment.

Plot

Steve, a ladies' man, and Dennis, a married father, work together as paramedics in New Orleans, Louisiana. They are called out to a series of cases where people are either dead in strange circumstances or whose stories are incoherent. The cases are linked to a new designer drug called Synchronic.

At a domestic abuse call, they find a stabbing victim and an old sword embedded in the wall.  While Steve tends to an injured man, he is accidentally pierced by a dirty needle.  Being tested for possible infections leads to the discovery of cancer in his underdeveloped and non-calcified pineal gland. The second call, a burn victim, is a completely burned body. The third call is a bite from a venomous snake no longer found in the area.

On a call to a drug party, they find a dead boy, and a girl says there was a third girl, Brianna, Dennis's teenage daughter. The next morning. Steve goes to a local smoke shop and buys all the Synchronic, which he learns is discontinued.  As he leaves, Steve declines a man's offer to pay triple its worth and stays firm even when the man ups his offer to almost 20 times what he paid. The next morning, Steve catches the man breaking into his house.  He says he is the chemist who created Synchronic from a red flower that grows in the California desert, which alters the pineal gland's perception of time. Children, who have a non-calcified pineal gland, pass through time.  Adults seem to only partially move through time like ghosts.

During their next call, a victim of a sword fight dies.  Steve, who is a fan of the history of science, quotes Albert Einstein on the meaninglessness of time when faced with his friend's death.  Under the stress of Brianna's disappearance, Dennis' marriage deteriorates.  When he learns someone has been stealing morphine, he misinterprets Steve's poor health and use of painkillers as evidence he is a morphine addict.  The two come to blows while treating a shouting patient.

At home, Steve takes Synchronic, travels back to when the area was covered in a swamp, and is attacked by a conquistador. Steve records his observations, deducing that Synchronic allows traveling backwards through time for seven minutes in the same geographical location.  When he travels back to the Ice Age, he realizes that his location when taking the pill determines the destination year.

During his next attempt, Steve takes back his dog, Hawking, to the 1920s where he is chased by the Ku Klux Klan. Moving from the original location, he loses Hawking and is unable to bring him back. Taking another Synchronic pill where Brianna disappeared, he discovers several tribal men, who chase him up a tree. He later learns from one of Brianna's friends that she may have wandered off before taking Synchronic. He also realizes that touching objects can anchor someone to the object's time period.

Steve and Dennis talk at a bar.  Dennis, who has taken his life for granted, believes he is headed to a divorce.  Steve tells Dennis about his cancer, and the two reconcile. Their driver, Tom, was stealing the morphine. At the graveyard of Steve's family, Steve shows Dennis the videos of his time travel, and they deduce that Brianna may have left a message for them to find in the park.  Steve travels back in time from there and finds himself on a battlefield during the War of 1812.  He is shot in the leg while searching for Brianna.  Upon finding her in a trench, he gives her his last pill.  Steve praises her idea to mark a boulder, but she says she did not.  At the boulder, they are intercepted by a looter who, believing Steve is a runaway slave, threatens to kill them both.  Steve distracts the looter as Brianna returns safely to the present. The looter steps on a landmine after being startled by an explosion. Steve realizes while sitting on the boulder that he is the one who carved the message in the boulder. Back in the present, as Dennis hugs Brianna, Steve appears ghost-like and shakes Dennis' hand.

Cast

Production
In September 2018, it was announced Jamie Dornan and Anthony Mackie had joined the cast of the film, with Justin Benson and Aaron Moorhead directing.

Synchronic shares continuity with previous films by Benson and Moorhead. It is mentioned that the titular drug was synthesized from a red flower grown in the California desert, referencing the plant smoked by members of a commune in the film The Endless.

Release
The film had its world premiere at the Toronto International Film Festival on September 7, 2019. Shortly after, Well Go USA Entertainment acquired distribution rights to the film, announcing a 2020 release. It was released in theaters on October 23, 2020.

Synchronic was released on digital and video on demand in the United States on January 12, 2021. The movie was released on Netflix in the US on April 16, 2021.

Reception 
The site's critics consensus reads: "Synchronic sets off on an intriguingly idiosyncratic journey that should satisfy fans of Aaron Moorhead and Justin Benson's earlier work." Metacritic reports a weighted average score of 64 out of 100 based on 23 critics, indicating "generally favorable reviews".

References

External links

2019 films
American drama films
American science fiction thriller films
Films directed by Aaron Moorhead
Films directed by Justin Benson
Films about time travel
2010s English-language films
2010s American films